Noah Kraft (born 1987/1988) is an American entrepreneur, and the co-founder and former CEO of Doppler Labs, an audio-technology company best known for its Here One Wireless Smart Earbuds. Despite a promising start, their flagship product suffered from various issues and sold many fewer units than expected upon release. After an unsuccessful attempt to raise additional capital, Doppler Labs ceased operations in December 2017.

Early life and education
Kraft was born In Los Angeles, and attended Oakwood School in North Hollywood. He is the son of Beth and Robert Kraft, who was president of 20th Century Fox Music from 1994 to 2012. He graduated from Brown University in 2009, with a bachelor's degree in international relations and history.

Career

Doppler Labs (2013–2017)
Kraft co-founded the now-defunct Doppler Labs with Fritz Lanman in 2013 in New York City. Doppler Labs later relocated to San Francisco and designed and manufactured in-ear computing technology, including earplugs and wireless earbuds. Kraft and Lanman initially promoted it as a breakthrough technology company, raising more than $50 million from venture capitalists and private investors. However, after planning to sell a few hundred thousand units of its main product, the Here One Wireless Smart Earbuds, Doppler only sold 25,000, leaving thousands of unsold units in warehouses. Electronics review sites, such as CNET, also raised questions about the viability of the Here One. Ultimately, due to its inability to mass-produce and sell product, Doppler was unable to raise more capital to fund its continual losses, and ceased operations in 2017.

Other projects 
Kraft worked for East Greenwich production studio Verdi Productions where he co-produced Inkubus, Infected, and Loosies. Kraft co-produced Bleed for This, a boxing biopic that debuted at the Toronto International Film Festival in September 2016. In 2011, Kraft Co-Founded Clown & Sunset Aesthetics (CSA) with electronic musician Nicolas Jaar. Prior to founding Doppler Labs, Kraft was a strategic consultant for Google working for John Hanke on a mobile game called Ingress. Kraft also worked for Lyor Cohen during the founding of 300 Entertainment. Kraft worked for Google X for a brief stint from August 2019 to January 2020.

Industry honors and appearances
Kraft was the Forbes "30 Under 30" featured honoree in the consumer technology category in 2017. He was named one of Inc Magazine's "30 Under 30 Most Brilliant Young Entrepreneurs" in 2016, and as one of Fast Company’s "Most Creative People in Business" in the Tech Category in 2017. He has appeared in the Wall Street Journal, the New York Times, Rolling Stone, and Wired and was profiled in Fast Company's "Doppler Labs and the Quest to Build a Computer for the Ears".

Kraft has been recognized for product innovation by Inc. Magazine’s Game Changing Inventions of 2015, TIME Magazine's best inventions of 2015, SXSW’s "Best of Show" and "Music and Audio Innovations" awards in 2016, the Cannes Lions International Festival of Creativity Gold for Product Design in 2016 and through Here One's induction into the Smithsonian Institution's Cooper Hewitt Museum in New York City in 2018.

Kraft has spoken at TechCrunch Disrupt, Outside Valley, the CNET and TechCrunch stages at CES 2017, and Collision 2017. He has appeared on Bloomberg West, CNN Money, CNBC, Fox Business, and CBS This Morning.

Personal life
Kraft married Caroline Straty Kraft in 2014. They met in 2006 while both studying at Brown University.

References

Living people
Brown University alumni
People from Los Angeles
1980s births